Jürgen von Manger-Koenig (6 March 1923 – 15 March 1994) was a German actor and comedian.

Early life
Manger was born Jürgen Julius Emil Fritz Koenig in the Koblenz district of Ehrenbreitstein. His stage pseudonym as comedian was Adolf Tegtmeier.

TV shows

 Steel net - the twelfth knife (1958)
 Hello, neighbors (various episodes, 1963-1965)
 Secret agent Adolf Tegtmeier (6 episodes, 1966)
 Good evening - sounds, measures and theater (7 episodes, 1966-1968)
 13 x Macabres (various episodes, 1968)
 Jürgen von Manger as a witness of history (11 episodes, 1969)
 ARD - Glücksspirale (various episodes, 1969)
 In good German said (10 episodes, 1969)
 Stay human, says Tegtmeier (8 episodes, 1970)
 Tegtmeier's travels (20 episodes, 1972-1980)
 Election advertising for the FDP (various episodes, 1972)
 So Ääährlich - Tegtmeier's most beautiful Stückskes (various episodes, 1977)
 Tegtmeier clarifies (14 episodes, 1981-1983)
 When the television pictures become plastic (2 episodes, 1982)
 Tegtmeier (6 episodes, 1984-1985)
 Between onion and doubt (8 episodes, 1984-1986)

Television film
 Mr. Tägmeier tells (1962)
 The Mother-In-Law (1963)
 The driving school examination (1963)
 Line up for a date in Cologne (1964)
 The Marriage Institute (1964)
 Television - exclusive (1965)
 Looking back - but not in anger (1965)
 Program without broadcast (1965) (broadcast 1968)
 Adieu 1965 - Hello 1966 (1965/66)
 In this country nowadays: Ruhr parodists (1967)
 Travel in Germany (1968)
 The next one please! (1968)
 Review 68 (1968)
 Happiness Spiral (1970)
 Tegtmeier's Stückskes (1970)
 Aeehräu - That's life (1979)
 Jürgen von Manger - So Ääährlich... (1981) (broadcast 1987)
 Two dead in the transmitter and Don Carlos in the PoGl (1982)
 Schalkshow'82 (1982)
 Permit, Tegtmeier, in the front with Adolf (1982)
 Progress in technology - the step backwards of people (1984)
 Freshly Turned (1984)
 Songs and Words for the Turn (1984)
 Olympic speech (1984)
 Fresh, cheeky, happy-free? (1984)
 Tegtmeiers Trost (1984) (possibly only working title)
 Man, Tegtmeier! - Tour at IFA Berlin (1985) (canceled due to illness)
 On the 70th birthday of Jürgen von Manger (1993) (last television appearance)

Literature
 Peter F. Schütze , Mirjam von Jankó (ed.): One should imitate me first. Adolf Tegtmeier and Jürgen von Manger. Clear text, Essen 1998, . (with bibliography, pp. 173–175, and discography, pp. 175–176.)
 Wolfgang Schütz: Koblenz heads. People in the history of the city - namesake for streets and squares. 2nd revised. u. adult Edition. Publisher for advertising papers , Mülheim-Kärlich 2005, OCLC 712343799.
 Gerhard Schiweck (ed.) And Torsten Kropp (caricatures): Tegtmeier's heirs - "... maybe dat is a thing ..." An original and its heirs in 13 pictures. Frischtexte-Verlag, Herne 2009, .

References

External links
 

German male film actors
German male stage actors
Actors from Koblenz
1923 births
1994 deaths